Vishwambhar Dayalu Tripathi (5 October 1899 – 18 November 1959) was an Indian lawyer and politician.

References

External links
 Kamat Research Database
 Unnao District
 Gallery of Indian Autographs
 1.     Bal Ganga Dhar Tripathi, "Mere Da", Apraje Purusharth Ke Dhani Jan Nayak Pandit Vishwambhar Dayalu Tripathi Smriti Granth (Unnao, Uttar Pradesh: Vishwambhar Dayalu Tripathi Smarak Samiti, 2008), pp. 257–258.

Indian National Congress politicians
People from Uttar Pradesh
People from Unnao district
1899 births
1959 deaths
Members of the Constituent Assembly of India
India MPs 1952–1957
India MPs 1957–1962
Lok Sabha members from Uttar Pradesh